Phlyctibasidium is a fungal genus of uncertain taxonomic placement in the Agaricomycetes. This is a monotypic genus, containing the single corticioid species Phlyctibasidium polyporoideum.

References

Agaricomycetes
Monotypic Basidiomycota genera
Taxa named by Walter Jülich